The 2004 NFL draft was the procedure by which National Football League teams selected amateur college football players. It is officially known as the NFL Annual Player Selection Meeting.  The draft was held April 24–25, 2004 at the Theater at Madison Square Garden in New York City. No teams chose to claim any players in the supplemental draft that year.

The draft was shown on ESPN both days and eventually moved to ESPN2 both days. The draft began with the San Diego Chargers selecting Mississippi quarterback Eli Manning with the first overall selection. Due to his refusal to play for the Chargers, Manning was later traded to the New York Giants for their first selection, fourth overall pick Philip Rivers of NC State. There were 32 compensatory selections distributed among 16 teams, with the Eagles, Rams, and Jets each receiving 4 compensatory picks. The draft set several records, including the most wide receivers selected in the first round, with seven. Another record set by the draft was the most trades in the first round, with twenty-eight trades. The University of Miami set an NFL record for the most first rounders drafted with six, which would be tied by Alabama in 2021. Ohio State set an NFL draft record having 14 total players selected through all rounds. As of 2012, this draft also has two other records attached to it: it became the draft with the shortest time between having multiple quarterbacks being drafted and starting for Super Bowl winners (Ben Roethlisberger for the 2005 Steelers, and Manning for the 2007 Giants) and it has become the first draft ever to have produced two QBs who each won multiple Super Bowls (with Roethlisberger winning his second in 2008 and Manning his second in 2011).

The 255 players chosen in the draft were composed of:



As of the 2022 season, Arizona Cardinals punter Andy Lee is the only remaining selection on an NFL roster. Dallas Cowboys offensive lineman Jason Peters also remains active from this draft class, but he was not selected during the draft. Following Tom Brady’s retirement in February 2023, the 2004 NFL Draft is the oldest draft with active players.

Player selections

Notable undrafted players

Trades
In the explanations below,  (D) denotes trades that took place during the 2004 Draft, while  (PD) indicates trades completed pre-draft.

Round one

Round two

Round three

Round four

Round five

Round six

Round seven

Notes

References

External links
Football Outsiders – 2004 NFL Draft: Six Years Later (March 19, 2010)

Sources
 
 
 
 
 

National Football League Draft
Draft
Madison Square Garden
NFL draft
NFL Draft
American football in New York City
2000s in Manhattan
Sporting events in New York City